Tato (died 510) was an early 6th century king of the Lombards. He was the son of Claffo and a king of the Lething Dynasty.
According to Procopius, the Lombards were subject and paid tribute to the Heruli during his reign. In 508, he fought with King Rodulf of the Heruli, who was slain. This was a devastating blow to the Heruli and augmented the power of the Lombards. According to Paul the Deacon, the war started because Tato's daughter Rumetrada murdered Rodulf's brother.

Tato was murdered by his nephew Wacho in 510.

References

Origo Gentis Langobardorum
Historia Langobardorum by Paul the Deacon
Zur Geschichte der Langobarden by Dr. Ludwig Schmidt (Leipzig, 1885)

External links
A translation of Historia Langobardorum
History of the Lombards." Encyclopædia Britannica. 2010. Encyclopædia Britannica Online. 25 Mar. 2010

5th-century births
510 deaths
6th-century murdered monarchs
6th-century Lombard monarchs
Lombard warriors
Lethings
Year of birth unknown